The Nanjing Youth Olympic Sports Park is a sport complex located in Pukou District, Nanjing, China. Its construction was started in December 2011 as part of the venues used for 2014 Summer Youth Olympics. The complex, which occupies around 1,000,000 m2 of land, consists of a main arena with other smaller sport venues.

Main arena
The main arena consists of two parts, the 21,000-seater Nanjing Youth Olympic Sports Park Arena and the 18,000-seater Nanjing Youth Olympic Sports Park Stadium. Unveiled in November 2017, the indoor arena is the largest indoor stadium in China. The indoor arena can host a wide range of sports such as basketball, badminton, ice hockey, and gymnastics competitions.

Other facilities
During the 2014 Summer Youth Olympic Games, some permanent and temporary venues were built such as BMX Park, rugby sevens field, hockey field, modern pentathlon course, and beach volleyball arena. There is also the Nanjing Olympic Museum located in the park.

Tournaments hosted
 2016 World Roller Speed Skating Championships
 2018 BWF World Championships
 2019 FIBA Basketball World Cup

See also
List of indoor arenas in China

References

Sports venues in Nanjing
Multi-purpose stadiums in China
Olympic International Broadcast Centres